The 29 Diner is a diner in the City of Fairfax, Virginia. The diner is located at 10536 Fairfax Boulevard (U.S. Route 29/U.S. Route 50), a short distance west of the Boulevard's intersection with Chain Bridge Road (Virginia State Route 123).

History

The 29 Diner opened on July 20, 1947. It was built by the Mountain View Diners Company of Singac, New Jersey.   D.T. "Bill" Glascock (deceased) purchased the diner and had it shipped to a strip of land that he owned in Fairfax, Virginia.  Glascock and his wife, Elvira "Curly," ran the diner for the first several years, and thereafter leased the building to a succession of business owners.

In 1973, the Tastee Diner company bought the location and it became the Tastee 29 Diner.

In 1992, the diner was declared to be a historic site. Marc Christian Wagner, an architectural historian from the Charlottesville-based Preservation Associates of Virginia organization wrote the statement of significance. The opening of the statement declares:

Thus, in 1992 the Tastee 29 Diner was added to the list of National Register of Historic Places.

In the late-1990s, Fredy and Ginger Guevara (Ginger being a former waitress at the 29 Diner in the mid-1960s) bought the location and restored its original name of 29 Diner.

For years the diner was-open twenty four hours a day, seven days a week, with the exception being Christmas Day. In January 2009, the diner began closing on Monday nights due to the recession facing the United States, however in 2014 it was restored back to being open 24 hours a day.

In May, 2014, the 29 Diner went out of business under the operations of Fredy and Ginger Guevara, but the property lease was quickly picked up by Fairfax native John Wood, who planned to reopen it in the summer of 2014. After some delays, the diner reopened to the public at 12:01am on September 11, 2014. It is open 24 hours Tuesday through Sunday and closed on Monday.

Culture
Fairfax, Virginia, mayor Robert Lederer has made a recent annual tradition of dining at the 29 Diner on Thanksgiving.

John Walsh, host of America's Most Wanted, made a visit to the diner in 1999 with two bodyguards.

Bill Griffith featured 29 Diner in the July 23, 2003, and April 21, 2012, installments of Zippy the Pinhead.

References

External links
 Official website
 National Register of Historic Places - Fairfax County, Virginia
 Review of the Restaurant on NotForTourists.com
 29 Diner at MasonWiki
 2003 Val Kilmer Film Festival (mention made of 29 Diner)

Companies based in Fairfax, Virginia
National Register of Historic Places in Fairfax, Virginia
Commercial buildings completed in 1947
Streamline Moderne architecture in Virginia
Diners on the National Register of Historic Places
Diners in Virginia
Commercial buildings on the National Register of Historic Places in Virginia
1947 establishments in Virginia
Restaurants established in 1947